Jaroslav Drobný defeated Eric Sturgess  6–3, 6–3, 6–3 in the final to win the men's singles tennis title at the 1951 French Championships.

Draw

Key
 Q = Qualifier
 WC = Wild card
 LL = Lucky loser
 r = Retired

Finals

References

1951
1951 in French tennis